Festival of Death is a BBC Books original novel written by Jonathan Morris and based on the long-running British science fiction television series Doctor Who. It features the Fourth Doctor, Romana II, and K9.

The book won "Best Past Doctor Adventure of 2000" in a Doctor Who Magazine reader poll.

Festival of Death was re-released in 2013 for the 50th Anniversary of Doctor Who.

Synopsis
'The Beautiful Death' is a theme park ride that allows people to experience the afterlife. At least, that is the intention. Riders are now turning into brain-damaged shells of their former selves. The Doctor arrives at the end of this disaster and is praised for saving everyone, something he did not actually do yet. With the help of all-new characters, he investigates through time and discovers he did save all in danger. All it took was the sacrifice of his own life.

2000 British novels
2000 science fiction novels
Past Doctor Adventures
Fourth Doctor novels
Novels by Jonathan Morris